Susan Casey Sumner (born 1958) is a former American politician who served as a member of the Washington State Senate from 1992 to 1993.  She represented Washington's 28th legislative district as a Republican.  She was appointed on February 12, 1992, to serve the unexpired term of Stanley C. Johnson, serving until the seat was taken over by Shirley Winsley, who won  election to the seat that November.

References

1958 births
Living people
Republican Party Washington (state) state senators
Women state legislators in Washington (state)